Douglas Pharmaceuticals Ltd is a New Zealand-based manufacturer of pharmaceutical products. Founded in 1967 by West Auckland chemist Graeme Douglas, the company started out distributing prescription medicines, before manufacturing and later successfully researching and developing its own products for export.

History 
Douglas Pharmaceuticals began when founder, Graeme Douglas, created a cough syrup called Kofsin, while working as a chemist in Te Atatū, West Auckland. As demand for the cough syrup grew, the company contracted manufacturing chemists to maintain enough supply. Afterwards, the company began importing niche pharmaceuticals and packaging them at Douglas's chemist shop before distributing them to other pharmacists. In the early 1970s, Douglas's chemist shop had over $2 million in revenue when he sold it to focus on the pharmaceutical business.

By the late 80s, Douglas Pharmaceuticals was selling over 40 products and had a revenue of $25 million, which increased in ten years to more than $70 million.

In 2012, Sir Graeme's eldest son Jeff began handling much of the day-to-day running of the company. In 2014, Graeme Douglas stepped down from the company's day-to-day business, and his son Jeff Douglas became managing director of the company.

As of 2016, the company employed more than 450 people and manufactured products sold in 35 countries.

Founder Sir Graeme Douglas died on 1 September 2016.

References

External links
 Douglas Pharmaceuticals global web site
 NZ Herald - NZ firm targets US acne market

Manufacturing companies of New Zealand
Pharmaceutical companies of New Zealand